Janusz Stanisław Reiter (born 6 August 1952) is a Polish diplomat.

Career
Janusz Reiter has graduated from German studies at the University of Warsaw. A former Solidarity activist and editor of certain opposition magazines for seven years during communist rule in Poland, Reiter became an editor for Życie Warszawy and later served as diplomat for Poland. From 1990 to 1995, he was Poland's ambassador to Germany. He was the Polish ambassador to the United States from 2005 to 2007, accredited to the Bahamas as well.

Reiter returned to Poland in late 2007 and took the position of Poland's Special Envoy for Climate Change. He also served as vice-chairman of the management board of the media company Presspublica. From 2010 until 2013, he was the president of the Polish Center for International Relations; he now serves as chairman of the board. Also, he is on the advisory board of OMFIF where he participates in various meetings regarding the financial and monetary system.

Reiter has received the Grand Crosses with Star and Sash of the Order of Merit of the Federal Republic of Germany.

Other activities
 Scope Group, Member of the Advisory
 Deutsche Bank, Member of the Advisory Board

Bibliography

References

1952 births
Living people
Ambassadors of Poland to Germany
Ambassadors of Poland to the Bahamas
Ambassadors of Poland to the United States
Grand Crosses with Star and Sash of the Order of Merit of the Federal Republic of Germany
People from Kościerzyna
Solidarity (Polish trade union) activists
University of Warsaw alumni